Leonhard Euler (1707–1783) was a Swiss mathematician and physicist.

Euler may also refer to:

Science and technology
 Euler (programming language), a computer programming language
 Euler (software), a numerical software package
 EulerOS, a Linux operating system based distribution
 Euler Portal to Mathematics Publications, hosted by EMIS
 Euler-Werke, an aircraft manufacturer owned by August Euler.
 AMS Euler, a typeface
 Project Euler a series of challenging mathematical/computer programming problems

Other uses
 Euler (surname)
 Euler Hermes, a global credit insurance company
 EULAR, European rheumatology organization
 Euler jump, an edge jump in figure skating
 Euler (crater), a lunar impact crater in the southern half of the Mare Imbrium

See also 
 List of things named after Leonhard Euler
 Euller (disambiguation)
 Oiler (disambiguation)